Stegen is a village in the commune of "Aerenzdallgemeng", in eastern Luxembourg.

The Saint Bartholomew church of Stegen was classified as a national monument in 2021.

The stream Tirelbaach is flowing through the eastern part of Stegen.

Stegen is home to the goat farm Bio Baltes in Um Suewel. It produces goat cheese for a large number of supermarkets throughout Luxembourg.

References

Diekirch (canton)
Towns in Luxembourg